Olimpia Iris Lombardi (born 16 March 1960) is an Argentine philosopher of science whose research involves ontology in chemistry and in quantum mechanics, including the use of ontological pluralism to argue for treating chemistry as autonomous from, rather than subsidiary to, physics.

Education and career
After studying at the Escuela Superior de Comercio Carlos Pellegrini,
Lombardi entered the University of Buenos Aires, where she earned a degree in electromechanical engineering in 1983. Returning to the university for graduate study, she earned a licenciatura in philosophy in 1996, and completed her doctorate in 2001, with the dissertation El Problema del Determinismo en la Física.

She is a Superior Investigator for the Argentine National Scientific and Technical Research Council (CONICET) and a researcher at the University of Buenos Aires, where she is the director of the group on philosophy of particular sciences.

Books
Lombardi is the author of Aspectos Filosóficos de la Teoría del Caos (2011), a coauthor of the books Introduction to the Modal-Hamiltonian Interpretation of Quantum Mechanics (2010) and Los Múltiples Mundos de la Ciencia: Un Realismo Pluralista y su Aplicación a la Filosofía de la Física (2012), and a co-editor of the books Fronteras del determinismo: Filosofía y Ciencia en diálogo (2015), What is Quantum Information? (2017), and Quantum Worlds: Perspectives on the Ontology of Quantum Mechanics (2019).

Recognition
In 2006, Lombardi won the Konex Award in humanities for her work in logic and the philosophy of science.

References

External links

1960 births
Living people
Argentine philosophers
Argentine women philosophers
Argentine women academics
University of Buenos Aires alumni
Academic staff of the University of Buenos Aires
Philosophers of science